Windows Journal is a discontinued notetaking application, created by Microsoft and included in Windows XP Tablet PC Edition as well as selected editions of Windows Vista and later. It allowed the user to create and organize handwritten notes and drawings, and to save them in a  file, or export them in TIFF format. It can use an ordinary computer mouse to compose a handwritten note, as well as a graphics tablet or a Tablet PC.

JNT format
Microsoft has provided no documentation for its proprietary  file format, which makes it difficult or impossible for other developers or software publishers to read or write  files. Therefore, other programs cannot import Windows Journal files. There can be no third-party applications that make direct use of files created with Windows Journal.  files should be converted to other formats such as XML with the Journal Reader Supplemental Component, for external applications to use.

Windows Journal Viewer
Windows Journal Viewer, also created by Microsoft, allows viewing the Windows Journal notes ( files) on other systems without the Tablet PC software. The most recently released version 1.5.2316.0 for Windows 2000, Windows XP and Windows Server 2003 was removed as of March 2016.

Discontinuation
Windows Journal was not visibly updated after its introduction and eventually became obsolete, although it was tested for compatibility throughout the development of new versions of Windows and patched for security vulnerabilities as recently as May 2016. Windows Journal was available in the original July 2015 release of Windows 10 and the November Update, but it was removed in the summer 2016 "Anniversary Update." All of its features are available in OneNote, which is integrated into Windows 10. OneNote does not support  files, but Microsoft offers the ability to reinstall Journal and a tool for converting Journal files to OneNote files. On July 12, 2016, Microsoft released a patch (KB3170735) for Windows 7 and Windows 8.1 to notify users about future Windows Journal developments. On August 9, 2016, Microsoft released another patch (KB3161102) to remove Windows Journal from Windows 7 and Windows 8.1 due to the Windows Journal file format (Journal Note File, or JNT) being susceptible to security exploits.

See also
 Comparison of notetaking software

References

Further reading

Discontinued Windows components
Microsoft Tablet PC
Note-taking software